The Kiribati ambassador accredited in Washington, D. C. is the official representative of the Government in Tarawa to the Government of the United States.

List of representatives

References 

Ambassadors of Kiribati to the United States
Ambassadors of Kiribati
Kiribati
United States